Grevillea quadricauda, commonly known as four-tailed grevillea, is a species of flowering plant in the family Proteaceae and is endemic to eastern Australia. It is an erect, dense, bushy shrub with narrowly egg-shaped to elliptic leaves and small, loose clusters of green and pinkish-red flowers.

Description

Taxonomy
Grevillea quadricauda was first formally described in 1994 by Peter Olde and Neil Marriott in the journal Telopea from specimens collected in 1992. The specific epithet (quadricauda) refers to four tail-like appendages on the flowers.

Distribution and habitat
Four-tailed grevillea grows in woodland and forest, usually along creeks and watercourses and is found in a few locations near Helidon in south-east Queensland and a few locations near Whiporie and Grafton in north-eastern New South Wales.

Conservation status
Grevillea quadricauda is listed as "vulnerable" under the Australian Government Environment Protection and Biodiversity Conservation Act 1999 and the New South Wales Government Biodiversity Conservation Act 2016. It was one of eleven species selected for the Save a Species Walk campaign in April 2016; scientists walked 300 km to raise money for collection of seeds to be prepared and stored at the Australian Plant Bank at the Australian Botanic Garden Mount Annan.

References

quadricauda
Proteales of Australia
Flora of New South Wales
Flora of Queensland
Plants described in 1994